Gavin Price-Jones is a former professional rugby league footballer who played in the 1990s and 2000s.

Playing career

International honours
Gavin Price-Jones won caps for Wales while a Welsh Student in 1995 against United States (2 matches).

Club career
Gavin Price-Jones played for the Canberra Raiders in the 1990 Presidents Cup alongside; Anthony Rudd, Brett Mullins, Roger Kenworthy, Darrell McDonald, Steve Stone (c). Jason Gregory, Brett Goldspink, Brett Boyd, Darren Fritz, Matthew Baker, Peter Field, Jason Death. Reserves: Nigel Gaffey, Kevin Hinton, David Boyle, Matthew Jones and Adrian Davis

References

External links
https://trove.nla.gov.au/newspaper/article/120889028 The Canberra Times - Canberra Raiders Teams

1970 births
Living people
Place of birth missing (living people)
Rochdale Hornets players
Rugby league centres
Rugby league second-rows
Rugby league wingers
Swinton Lions players
Wales national rugby league team players